Aung may refer to:

Aung (name), including a list of people with the name
Aung Yang, a village in Shwegu Township, Bhamo District, Kachin State
Myan Aung, a town in the Ayeyarwady Region